Goa is the soundtrack album by Yuvan Shankar Raja to the 2010 romantic comedy film of the same name, directed by Venkat Prabhu, and produced by Soundarya Rajinikanth's Ocher Studios, starring Jai, Vaibhav, Premji Amaran, Sneha, Piaa Bajpai and Melanie Marie Jobstreibitzer in prominent roles.

Background
The album consists of nine songs, composed by Yuvan Shankar Raja, Venkat Prabhu's cousin and regular music director, joining together for the third time after delivering the successful chartbuster albums Chennai 600028 (2007) and Saroja (2008). A major highlight of the soundtrack is a "family song", the first in the album, titled "Ezhezhu Thalaimuraikkum" that features "the cousins of the family", including music director Yuvan Shankar Raja, his siblings Karthik Raja and Bhavatharini, and his cousins Premji Amaran and director Venkat Prabhu himself. The song, penned by Gangai Amaran, is said to talk about and pay tribute to the elders of the Raja family—Pavalar Varadarajan, R. D. Bhaskar, Ilaiyaraaja and Gangai Amaren—and the family's home town, Pannaipuram (Theni), where the song was also recorded. It was recorded live using a live orchestra, as it was usually done in the 1980s, but which has become a rarity in recent days. Despite earlier reports that indicated, that Parthi Baskar, another cousin, would lend his voice for that song as well, he, however, wasn't featured in the final version of the song. Another highlight is a song featuring Yuvan Shankar's father, legendary Indian composer Ilaiyaraaja, who agreed to lend his voice, after having been approached by Venkat Prabhu, who was very eager to make him sing in one of his films, along with legendary singer S. P. Balasubrahmanyam. Another song is rendered by Ajeesh, the winner of the second season of the reality-based singing competition Airtel Super Singer.

Apart from these songs, additionally a special promotional song was also composed as earlier reported, the Goa title track that was released as a teaser trailer prior to the release of the film during Deepavali 2009. The song also features Chynk Showtyme and Pav Bundy, two "international artists", who performed at Yuvan's Dubai concert in December 2009 as well. It also features a club mix arranged by Premgi Amaren. Other singers to render their voices for the album include K. S. Chitra and actress-singers Andrea Jeremiah and Mamta Mohandas, the latter singing for the first time under composer Yuvan Shankar Raja's direction. The lyrics for the songs were written by 'Kavignar' Vaali and Venkat Prabhu's father, Gangai Amaran as usual.

Track listing

Release
The album's premiere event, where the soundtrack would be released officially was postponed several times due to delays and problems in the production and to avoid clashes with other big film events and releases. The album was earlier planned to be released during last week of October, then got postponed to second week of December (coinciding with producer Soundarya's father Rajinikanth's birthday), and later postponed to 23 December 2009, and finally released on 6 January 2010. Though producer Soundarya Rajinikanth had planned to have a grand event at Chennai Trade Centre for the album launch, with many prominent film industry personalities gracing the function, the album was eventually released in a very simple manner by Soundarya's father Rajinikanth at his own residence at Poes Garden, and about which the press and media wasn't informed and not invited. On 1 January 2010, a few days before the official release, the songs were broadcast on several radio channels during New Year special programs for promotional purposes.

Reception 
The album received positive reviews. Behindwoods rated the album 3 out of 5 stating "A neat and slick album that mixes the predictable and the pleasantly novel. Yuvan scores again in the rhythm department. One truly wishes the film is equally lively and fulfils Venkat Prabhu’s ‘hattrick’ aspiration." Indiaglitz rated the album 3 out of 5 stating "Splendid show by Yuvan Shankar Raja in Goa. Listen to the album and get charmed. It is like packing bags and going all the way to enjoy a splendid vacation in Goa." Rediff rated the album 2.5 out of 5, stating "Yuvan Shankar Raja usually reserves the best of his work for certain directors and so far, Venkat Prabhu has been one of them. This time around, though, either he's run out of inspiration, or has been under strict orders not to exert himself too much. Aside from a few moments, you can't really sense his presence anywhere. There are a lot of fireworks, much rapping and clash of percussion instruments, but his signature tunes are hard to find. Being Yuvan, he doesn't really mess up but you'll just have to resign yourself to enjoying what little of originality there is." Milliblog gave favourable reviews stating "Goa’s soundtrack is exhilarating – Yuvan opens the year in style!"

Accolades

Personnel
 Percussion: Prasad, Ramana, Sundar, Jaicha
 Additional Rhythm Programming: Ramji
 Strings & Guitar: Amalraj
 Drums: V. Kumar
 Nadaswaram: Thirumoorthy
 Sitar: Ganesh
 Chorus & Harmony: Dr. Narayanan, Vijay, Sam, Senthil, Sucharitha, Feji & Priya
 Sound Engineer: Paranithran, Guru Dr. Ilayaraja, Sekar
 Sound mixing and mastering: Ramji and Guru

References

Yuvan Shankar Raja soundtracks
2010 soundtrack albums
Sony Music India soundtracks
Tamil film soundtracks